"Father of All..." is a song by American rock band Green Day, released as the lead single from their thirteenth studio album, Father of All Motherfuckers, on September 10, 2019.

Background and composition
Lead vocalist Billie Joe Armstrong has stated the song is about "making people feel bad." Armstrong added "Rock and roll sometimes has become so tame because a lot of rock acts are always trying to look for the feel-good song of the year or something." Despite that, Rolling Stone described the song as "bright, upbeat and a big departure from the tone of 2016's Revolution Radio."

A departure in sound for the band, the song has been described as garage rock revival,  garage punk, and dance-punk. Containing dirty guitars, grooving bass, and rolling drums, as well as filtered and falsetto vocals, it has been compared to their tenth studio album ¡Dos! (2012) and their side-project Foxboro Hot Tubs. The song is featured riff from the song "Fire" by The Jimi Hendrix Experience.

Music video
The music video pays homage to the "Guitar Man" portion of the opening number from Elvis Presley's 1968 comeback special. In it, the band performs in front of the dancers in the red background while footage of people doing various movements intervene.

Charts

Weekly charts

Year-end charts

Personnel
 Billie Joe Armstrong- lead vocals, guitar
 Mike Dirnt- bass guitar
 Tre Cool- drums and percussion

References

Green Day songs
2019 singles
Songs written by Billie Joe Armstrong
Songs written by Mike Dirnt
Songs written by Tré Cool
Reprise Records singles
American garage rock songs
Garage punk songs
2019 songs